Kutets is a rural locality (a village) in Dubrovsky District, Bryansk Oblast, Russia. The population was 45 as of 2010. There is 1 street.

Geography 
Kutets is located 17 km northwest of Dubrovka (the district's administrative centre) by road. Bolshaya Ostrovnya is the nearest rural locality.

References 

Rural localities in Dubrovsky District